Joseph Guy (30 July 1813 – 15 April 1873) was an English professional cricketer who played first-class cricket from 1837 to 1854.

A right-handed batsman and occasional wicket-keeper who was mainly associated with Nottinghamshire, he made 149 known appearances in first-class matches.  He represented the Players in the Gentlemen v Players series and was an original member of William Clarke's All-England Eleven.  He also played for Hampshire.

Guy was a great stylist as a batsman and Clarke said of him: "Elegance, all elegance, fit to play before the Queen in her parlour."

Guy scored 3395 runs in his first-class career at 13.41 with a top score of 98 from eight half-centuries.  He took 102 catches and completed 14 stumpings.

References

External links

1813 births
1873 deaths
English cricketers
English cricketers of 1826 to 1863
All-England Eleven cricketers
Hampshire cricketers
Nottinghamshire cricketers
North v South cricketers
Players cricketers
Cricketers from Nottingham
Midland Counties cricketers
Nottingham Cricket Club cricketers
Players of Nottinghamshire cricketers
Gentlemen of Southwell cricketers
Fast v Slow cricketers
Nicholas Felix's XI cricketers
Married v Single cricketers
Over 36 v Under 36 cricketers